The 2020 Ohio general elections were held on November 3, 2020 throughout the US state of Ohio. The office of the Ohio Secretary of State oversees the election process, including voting and vote counting.

To vote by mail, registered Ohio voters must have requested a ballot by October 31, 2020. As of early October some 2,112,685 voters have requested mail ballots.

Federal offices

President

Senate
There is no U.S. Senate election in Ohio in 2020.

House of Representatives

All of Ohio's 16 seats in the United States House of Representatives were up for election in 2020.

State offices

Board of Education

General Assembly

Senate

The 16 even-numbered districts out of 33 seats in the Ohio Senate are up for election in 2020. Fourteen of these seats are held by Republicans and two are held by Democrats. Prior to the election, Republicans hold 24 seats and Democrats hold 9 seats.

House of Representatives

All 99 seats in the Ohio House of Representatives are up for election in 2020. Prior to the election, Republicans hold 61 seats and Democrats hold 38 seats.

Supreme Court

While judicial races in Ohio are technically non-partisan (party affiliations are not listed on the ballot), candidates run in party primaries. Terms are six years, and justices may run for re-election an unlimited number of times before their 70th birthday.

Associate Justice (Term commencing 01/01/2021)

Republican primary

Candidates
Sharon Kennedy, incumbent Associate Justice of the Supreme Court of Ohio

Results

Democratic primary

Candidates
John O'Donnell, Cuyahoga County Court of Common Pleas, General Division judge and candidate for Ohio Supreme Court in 2014 and 2016

Results

General election

Results

Associate Justice (Term commencing 01/02/2021)

Republican primary

Candidates
Judith French, incumbent Associate Justice of the Supreme Court of Ohio

Results

Democratic primary

Candidates
Jennifer Brunner, incumbent Judge of the Ohio Court of Appeals for the 10th District and former Ohio Secretary of State (2007–2011)

Results

General election

Results

Court of Appeals

District 1

Term commencing 02/09/2021

District 2

Term commencing 02/09/2021

District 3

Term commencing 02/09/2021

District 4

Term commencing 02/09/2021

Unexpired term ending 02/08/2023

District 5

Term commencing 02/09/2021

District 6

Term commencing 02/09/2021

Term commencing 02/10/2021

District 7

Term commencing 02/09/2021

Term commencing 02/10/2021

District 8

Term commencing 02/09/2021

Term commencing 02/10/2021

Term commencing 02/11/2021

Term commencing 02/12/2021

Unexpired Term ending 01/01/2023

District 9

Term commencing 02/09/2021

District 10

Term commencing 02/09/2021

Term commencing 07/01/2021

District 11

Term commencing 02/09/2021

Term commencing 02/10/2021

District 12

Term commencing 01/01/2021

Term commencing 02/09/2021

See also
 Postal voting in the United States, 2020
 Elections in Ohio
 Political party strength in Ohio

References

Further reading

External links
  (State affiliate of the U.S. League of Women Voters)

 
 
 
 . ("Deadlines, dates, requirements, registration options and information on how to vote in your state")

 
Ohio